Aghcheh Kohol (also Romanized as Āghcheh Kohol and Āghcheh Kahal) is a village in Yurchi-ye Sharqi Rural District, Kuraim District, Nir County, Ardabil Province, Iran. At the 2006 census, its population was 57, in 7 families.

References 

Towns and villages in Nir County